Artilleriyskiy Tyagach Tyazholiy, or AT-T (meaning "heavy artillery tractor") was a Soviet Cold War-era artillery tractor. The AT-T is based on the chassis and drive system from the T-54 tank. However, the hull has been rotated 180 degrees, with the engine, clutch, gearbox, steering gear and drive wheels located at the front of the vehicle (on the tank, these are located to the rear). The crew cabin is also located in the front part of the vehicle, and is from the ZIS-150 and ZIL-164 trucks.

Variants
BAT-M obstacle removing vehicle
BTM-3 high-speed trench digging vehicle
Kharkovchanka Antarctic off-road vehicle
MDK-2M pits digging vehicle
P-40 radar

External links

O. Protasov - AT-T heavy artillery tractor 

Artillery tractors
Military vehicles of the Soviet Union
Military vehicles introduced from 1945 to 1949